Kathlyn is a feminine given name. Notable people with the name include:

Kathlyn Curtis (born 1963), Canadian judge
Kathlyn Gilliam (1930–2011), American civil rights activist
Kathlyn Kelly (born 1919), American athlete
Kathlyn Ragg (born 1962), Fijian cyclist
Kathlyn Williams (1879–1960), American actress

See also
The Adventures of Kathlyn, 1913 film
Kathleen (given name)
Kathryn (name)

Feminine given names
Filipino feminine given names